Henry Howard Hiatt (1868 – 30 October 1933) was a British gymnast. He competed in the men's individual all-around event at the 1900 Summer Olympics.

References

External links
 

1868 births
1933 deaths
British male artistic gymnasts
Olympic gymnasts of Great Britain
Gymnasts at the 1900 Summer Olympics
Sportspeople from London
People from Marylebone
Date of birth missing